Father, Mother and Nine Children is a 1958 West German comedy film directed by Erich Engels and starring Heinz Erhardt, Camilla Spira and Corny Collins.

The film's sets were designed by the art director Walter Haag.

Synopsis
Friedrich Schiller, a baker and respected family man with nine children, is wrongly suspected of having an affair with his employer's wife.

Cast
 Heinz Erhardt as Friedrich Schiller
 Camilla Spira as Martha Schiller
 Corny Collins as Thea Schiller
 Maria Sebaldt as Lollo Kueppers
 Erik Schumann as Francois Dupont
 Willy Millowitsch as Anton
 Pero Alexander as Klaus Fürbringer
 Elke Aberle as Julchen Schiller
 Renate Küster as Regine Dupont, geb. Schiller
 Gaby Steffan as Luise
 Monika Ahrens as Lene
 Margitta Scherr as Anni
 Ernst Reinhold as Karl
 Thomas Braut as Hans
 Harald Martens as Eduard "Ede" Schiller
 Reiner Brönneke as Heinz Horstmann
 Werner Finck as Herr Zellhorn, Fürbringers Vermieter

References

Bibliography 
 Hans-Michael Bock and Tim Bergfelder. The Concise Cinegraph: An Encyclopedia of German Cinema. Berghahn Books, 2009.

External links 
 

1958 films
1958 comedy films
German comedy films
West German films
1950s German-language films
Films directed by Erich Engels
1950s German films